Ushnas Prize, also known as the Shri Ushnas Paritoshik (Gujarati: શ્રી ઉશનસ્ પારિતોષિક), is a literary award presented in Gujarat, India, by the Gujarati Sahitya Parishad (Gujarati Literary Council). The award is named after the Gujarati poet Ushnas. The Ushnas Prize is conferred every two years to the poet who has authored the most outstanding long narrative poem or series of sonnets published during the previous two year period.

Recipients 
Following is the list of recipients.

References

Awards established in 1982
Gujarati literary awards
1982 establishments in Gujarat